City Limits is a 2004 Italian crime film written and directed by Andrea Costantini and starring Edoardo Leo. It won the award for best production at the 2005 Brooklyn Film Festival.

Plot 
Commissioner Aldo Chessari is sent to direct a police detachment on the outskirts of Rome, a temporary station in a hot area where he is entrusted with few means and few men. His deputy, Lorenzo Corsi, a young man just out of the Academy, collides with the corrupt and deformed reality of real life. The small police station appears to be a frontier outpost, a punitive destination where recruits and hotheads have been assigned. Chessari would like a quiet department, routine operations, stalking and wiretapping and no fuss that could affect his chances of career advancement. But his men, a group of mavericks, do not stop in front of the rules imposed by power, even reaching the limit of legality.

Cast 
Edoardo Leo as Deputy Commissioner Lorenzo Corsi
 Elisabetta Cavallotti as Francesca Scanni
 Luca Ward as Dario Lattanzi
 Andrea Rivera as  Benedetto aka Ben 
Rolando Ravello as Inspector De Paolis
Giorgio Colangeli as Commissioner Chessari
 Simone Colombari as Franco Stiffi 
 Luciano Curreli as Mariani
 Vincenzo Ferrera as Aglietti
 Patrizia Caselli as Mara 
 Nello Mascia as Francesco 
 Anna Longhi as Lorenzo Corsi's Grandma

References

External links

Italian crime films
2000s crime films
Films set in Rome
2004 directorial debut films
2004 films
2000s Italian films